Garfagnina may refer to:

 The Garfagnina breed of cattle, from the Garfagnana, in Tuscany, Italy
 The Garfagnina Bianca breed of sheep, from the Garfagnana, in Tuscany, Italy
 The Garfagnina (goat) breed of goat, from the Garfagnana, in Tuscany, Italy